Agape is a genus of moths in the family Erebidae.

Species
 Agape arctioides Butler, 1887
 Agape chloropyga Walker, 1854

References
 Agape at Markku Savela's Lepidoptera and some other life forms
 Natural History Museum Lepidoptera genus database

Aganainae
Noctuoidea genera